The 2020 District of Columbia Republican presidential primary was held on June 2, 2020, along with seven other Republican presidential primaries that day. Donald Trump ran unopposed in the primary and thus won the vote and all of the district's 19 pledged delegates.

Results

References

Republican presidential primary
District of Columbia
District of Columbia Republican primaries